Mance Warner is an American professional wrestler currently performing for Major League Wrestling. He has previously competed in Combat Zone Wrestling where he is a former CZW World Heavyweight Champion and with IWA Mid-South where he has held both IWA Mid-South Heavyweight Championship and Tag Team championship. Warner is also a former AAW Heavyweight Champion, with his run being the longest in company history.

Professional wrestling career

Early career
Warner debuted in professional wrestling in 2015, at age 25. He trained under Billy Roc, a former pupil of Dory Funk Jr. and initially wrestled notably for Georgia's Atlanta Wrestling Entertainment and Indiana's SmashMouth Pro Wrestling (SPW).

Independent circuit (2016–2018)
The following year he began touring throughout the Midwest and worked with promotions including Ohio's Rockstar Pro, Indiana's Pro Wrestling King and EMERGE Wrestling, and West Virginia's Vicious Outcast Wrestling. He first gained national notoriety that same year as part of IWA Mid South.

He captured his first major independent championship in 2017 by winning the IWA Mid-South Tag Team Championship with partner Zodiak and soon thereafter began wrestling for promotions such as Absolute Intense Wrestling, Black Label Pro, and Combat Zone Wrestling. Throughout 2018 he competed regularly for CZW and AIW as well as IWA Mid-South (capturing the promotion's tag team titles for a second time) All American Wrestling, Freelance Wrestling and Glory Pro. Throughout this time he faced wrestlers including Matt Riddle, Michael Elgin and Jimmy Jacobs. At the close of 2018 he recorded the biggest 'win' of his career, defeating Rickey Shane Page for the CZW World Heavyweight Championship at CZW Cage of Death XX.

Major League Wrestling (2019–2021)
In 2019, Warner made his national television debut by signing with Major League Wrestling. His debut match was against Jimmy Yuta. On March 2, 2019 at MLW's Intimidation Games, he competed against Mexican legend LA Park. At MLW Saturday Night SuperFight he defeated Jimmy Havoc and Bestia 666 in a "Stairway to Hell" match in which a bale of barbed wire was suspended above the ring. Mance Warner was released by MLW in October 2021.

Return to Independent circuit 
On July 31, 2022, members of the Game Changer Wrestling roster invaded the Bunkhouse Battle Royal during the pre-show of Ric Flair's Last Match. He won the Bunkhouse Battle Royal by last eliminating Bully Ray.

Return to Major League Wrestling (2022-) 
In August 31, Major League Wrestling announced that Mance had returned to the company

Championships and accomplishments 
AAW Wrestling
AAW Heavyweight Championship (1 time) 
Bizzaro Lucha
Bizzaro Lucha Luchaversal Championship (1 time)
 Combat Zone Wrestling
 CZW World Heavyweight Championship (1 time)
Game Changer Wrestling
GCW Tag Team Championship (1 time) - with Matthew Justice
Horror Slam Wrestling
Horror Slam Tag Team Championship (1 time, current) - with Matthew Justice
IWA Mid South
IWA Mid-South Heavyweight Championship (2 times)
IWA Mid-South Tag Team Championship (1 time) - with Zodiak
Jim Crockett Promotions
Bunkhouse Battle Royal (2022)
 Pro Wrestling Illustrated
 Ranked No. 146 of the top 500 singles wrestlers in the PWI 500 in 2021
Pro Wrestling King
PWK Tag Team Championship (1 time) - with Luke Lawson
Unsanctioned Pro
Unsanctioned Pro Hardcore Championship (1 time)

References 

1988 births
American male professional wrestlers
People from Tennessee
Living people
21st-century professional wrestlers
CZW World Heavyweight Champions
AAW Heavyweight Champions